We Are Monster is the second studio album by German electronic music producer Rajko Müller under the alias Isolée, released in 2005.

Critical reception

We Are Monster was named the 53rd best album of the 2000s by Resident Advisor. "Schrapnell" was listed as the 328th best song of the 2000s by Pitchfork.

Track listing

References

External links
 

2005 albums
Isolée albums